Harness IP is a law firm headquartered in Troy, Michigan. In October 2021, the firm announced it has adopted Harness IP as its new name. The firm previously went by the abbreviated Harness Dickey.

Harness IP focuses exclusively on intellectual property. The firm provides legal services in all areas of patents, trademarks, and copyrights — including preparation and prosecution, licensing, litigation, and portfolio management services — as well as handling anti-counterfeiting, international rights, due diligence, and trade secret matters.

Today, the firm qualifies as one of the largest intellectual property law firms in the United States.

History

Harness IP was established in 1921 as a result of Detroit's growing automotive industry. The firm's founder, J. King Harness, formerly served as the patent department leader for the Ford Motor Company and later became the Chief Patent Counsel to Chrysler (now Stellantis). In 1925, Art Dickey and Hodgson Pierce joined the firm as partners.

Harness IP's first office was located within the General Motors Building. In the mid-1960s, the firm moved to the Fisher Building, followed by a move to Birmingham in 1973. The firm moved to its current office in Troy, Michigan, in the early 1990s.

Since then, the firm has opened three offices outside of Michigan: the firm's Clayton, Missouri office opened in 2000; the Reston, Virginia office opened in 2001; and the firm's Frisco, Texas office opened in 2015.

In anticipation of the firm's 100th anniversary, Harness IP created its first-ever CEO position in early 2020 and named former firm Principal Bill Coughlin to the new role. Coughlin previously served as the President & CEO of Ford Global Technologies, LLC and Assistant General Counsel to Ford Motor Company from 2000 to 2018. He also previously served as Chief Patent Counsel & IP Leader for DaimlerChrysler and Chief Trademark Counsel for Chrysler Corporation.

Today, the firm serves clients operating in a range of industries, including: agrifood tech; automotive and autonomous vehicles; biologics and biosimilars; chemistry and materials science; clean and green technology; consumer electronics; consumer products; electrical, computer, and internet; energy production and delivery; image processing; manufacturing; mechanical and electromechanical; medical devices; pharmaceutical and biotechnology; semiconductors; software and information technology; and telecommunications and wireless technology.

Diversity 

Harness IP has a Diversity & Inclusion Committee that leads the firm's diversity and inclusion efforts. Attorneys Leanne Rakers and Beth Coakley, who serve as chair and vice-chair, lead the committee.

In the spring of 2021, Harness IP launched the Diversity & Inclusion Fellowship for law students interested in pursuing a career in intellectual property law. The Fellowship provides law students who come from diverse backgrounds, are members of the LGBTQ community, have a disability, are women, or are veterans with a summer clerkship position and ongoing career mentoring while they are in law school and while they explore IP law as a career. Candidates who successfully complete the Fellowship program earn a $5,000 scholarship.

As part of Harness IP's diversity efforts, the firm is actively pursuing Midsize Mansfield Rule certification through the Diversity Lab. Named after Arabella Mansfield, the first female U.S. attorney, Mansfield Certification requires legal departments to consider at least 30% historically underrepresented lawyers for 60% or more of certain leadership roles and activities, among other criteria.

Harness IP is a member of the Leadership Counsel on Legal Diversity, a premier group of corporate and law firm leaders with the common goal of preparing future generations of diverse talent for the highest positions of leadership.

Harness IP spearheaded the IP Innovation Diversity Sprint Event, held in partnership with the Michigan State University College of Law, in the spring of 2021.

Harness IP is actively involved in organizations that promote and support diversity, including local bar associations as well as diversity committees and women-focused programs within the American Intellectual Property Law Association (AIPLA) and the Intellectual Property Owners Association (IPO).

Rankings

In 2021, Harness IP obtained 2,963 U.S. utility patents for its clients and was ranked tenth among the nation's top law firms by Harrity Analytics. Harness IP attorneys also obtained 343 U.S. trademark registrations in 2021 and were ranked tenth in the U.S. according to a poll published by the Oppedahl Toteboard.

Harness IP is honored to have earned inclusion in the Chambers USA guide for its Michigan and Missouri offices. Chambers describes the firm as “well versed in patent prosecution and enforcement” and “provides wide-ranging assistance with portfolio management, and in regard to IP licensing issues.” The description further commends the firm's “expertise in litigious mandates including inter partes reviews and domain name disputes as well as IP transactional matters such as due diligence.” Individual attorneys Beth Coakley, Matt Cutler, and Greg Meyer were also named as notable practitioners.

In 2019, Harness IP was ranked as the #2 firm representing the U.S. Patent Elite — the 100 companies with the largest active portfolios of granted U.S. patents, as reported by Intellectual Asset Management. At the time, Harness IP represented 44 of these companies and was given a separate #6 ranking for filing the most patent applications on their behalf.

Also in 2019, legal analytics firm Juristat ranked Harness Dickey among the top 5 U.S Law firms for overcoming Alice rejections.

Harness IP has received additional accolades from U.S. News – Best Lawyers® in the form of several top tier National Rankings for Trademark Law, Patent Law, Copyright Law, and Patent and Intellectual Property Litigation. The firm also received several Metropolitan Tier 1 Rankings for Patent Law, Trademark Law, and Litigation.

Office locations

While Harness IP conducts most of its business at a global level, its four physical offices are located in the United States.

 Troy, Michigan
 Clayton, Missouri
 Reston, Virginia
 Frisco, Texas

Firm areas of practice

The following is a list of Harness IP areas of practice, as listed on its website.
 Patents
 Trademarks and service marks
 Intellectual property litigation
 PTAB proceedings
 Copyrights
 Intellectual property transactions and due diligence
 International services
IP portfolio management

References

 Harness IP Official website of Harness IP.
https://www.law360.com/articles/1345847/this-firm-secured-the-most-utility-patents-again-in-2020
https://chambers.com/department/harness-dickey-intellectual-property-usa-5:34:12728:1:65538
https://chambers.com/department/harness-dickey-intellectual-property-usa-5:34:12743:1:65538
https://blog.oppedahl.com/?page_id=6730

Intellectual property law firms
Patent law firms
Law firms based in Michigan
Companies based in Troy, Michigan
1921 establishments in Michigan